Igginbottom's Wrench is a studio album by the band 'Igginbottom, released in 1969 through Deram Records originally on vinyl only. It has been reissued a number of times (sometimes under the group title of "Allan Holdworth & Friends"), most notably on CD for the first time on 5 March 1989, as well as a remastered edition in 2000 through Angel Air Records with extensive liner notes detailing the band's history. It is one of the first recordings to feature guitarist Allan Holdsworth.

Track listing

Personnel
'Igginbottom
Allan Holdsworth – vocals, guitar
Steven Robinson – vocals, guitar
Dave Freeman – drums
Mick Skelly – bass
Technical
Nick Watson – remastering (reissue)
Morgan Fisher – production
Maurice Bacon – production
Michael Jackson – production

References

1969 debut albums
Deram Records albums
Albums produced by Morgan Fisher
'Igginbottom albums